Mycteroperca is a genus of marine ray-finned fish, groupers from the subfamily Epinephelinae, part of the family Serranidae, which also includes the anthias and sea basses. They are predatory fish, largely associated with reefs and are found in tropical and subtropical seas in the Atlantic Ocean and the eastern Pacific Ocean. They are important target species for fisheries.

Characteristics
The fishes in the genus Mycteroperca have oblong bodies in which the depth of the body is less than the length of the head, which is a quarter to just under a third of the standard length. The length of the snout is noticeably longer than the diameter of the eye. The dorsal profile of the head is convex and the area between the eyes is also convex, having a width greater than the diameter of the eyes (in fish with a standard length greater than ). The edges of the preopercle are serrated and the serrations at the bones angle may, or may not, be enlarged. The upper edge of gill cover is convex. The lower edge of upper jaw is straight near the joint and there is no knob, distinct step or hook present. The supramaxilla well developed. The lower jaw projects beyond the upper jaw and there are obvious canines in the front of both jaws while there are also teeth on roof of the mouth. In these fishes the dorsal fin contains 11 spines and 15 to 18 soft rays while the anal fin contains 3 spines and 10 to 13 soft rays, the central rays being longer than the others. The caudal fin may be truncate, emarginate or concave in shape and has 8 branched fin rays and 9 to 12 rays in its lower part which are placed further towards the margin. The scales along the flanks around the lateral line are ctenoid.

Habitat and biology
The adults are piscivorous, apart from the species in the rubra species complex which feed on zooplankton. The juveniles prey largely on crustaceans, although they will eat other invertebrates.

Distribution
Mycteroperca groupers are mainly found in the eastern Pacific and western Atlantic Ocean with two species in the eastern Atlantic Ocean and the Mediterranean Sea.

Utilisation
The groupers in the genus Mycteroperca are valuable target species for both recreational and commercial fisheries.

Taxonomy
Mycteroperca was named as a genus by the American ichthyologist Theodore Nicholas Gill (1837–1914) with the type species being Serranus olfax. This genus appears to be more closely related to the genus Epinephelus than they are to the other relatively speciose genus in the tribe Epinephelini, Cephalopholis.

Extant Species
It contains the following species:

References

 
Epinephelini
Taxa named by Theodore Gill
Taxonomy articles created by Polbot